James "Jim" Hubbell (born 1931 in Mineola, New York) is a visual artist, architect, sculptor, stained-glass designer and founder of the Ilan-Lael Foundation living in Santa Ysabel, California. He is best known for designing and building organic-style structures that have been referred to as Hobbit houses.

Early life and education
While he was born in New York, his family soon moved to Connecticut and to other places, where Hubbell attended 13 schools in the first 12 years of his grade-school and junior-high education.

Hubbell was influenced at an early age when a maternal aunt married into the Findlay family, who owned an art gallery in Kansas and two in New York City that specialized in American Western painters. While in high school, Hubbell collected pictures of horses and began drawing them.

He studied design and painting in 1951 for a year at the Whitney art school in New Haven, Connecticut until he was drafted into the U.S. Army, where he served in Korea in Headquarters Company and Troop Information Education, making posters and charts. After returning from the Army, he studied painting and sculpture at the Cranbrook Academy of Art in Michigan, but he did not graduate.

Career
Hubbell has produced hand-crafted doors, stained-glass windows, gates, and sculpture using wood, stone, metal, glass and clay. His art and architecture have been installed in homes, schools, gardens, pavilions, nature centers, monasteries, museums and peace parks in California and worldwide. His art studio sits on a 40-acre ranch in Wynola, a community in Julian, California. During the 1950s and 1960s, Hubbell used natural, local materials to design Hobbit-like structures that became his family's compound.

Hubbell is a member of the Julian Arts Guild. His artwork is shown at the Santa Ysabel Art Gallery in the Hubbell Room.

Ilan-Lael Foundation 
Since 1994, Hubbell has led international teams of architectural students in building friendship-themed public parks on the coasts of Russia, San Diego, Tijuana, the Philippines, South Korea, Taiwan and, most recently in 2018, China, through the Ilan-Lael Foundation, an arts education foundation.

Awards 
In 2019, the San Diego County board of directors presented Hubbell with the Peacemaker of the Year Award for his international work on building friendship-themed public parks.

Personal life 
Hubbell married Anne Stewart in 1958, and soon after, the couple purchased their Wynola property. They have four sons, for whom they built a separate structure, titled The Boys' House. In 2003, the couple lost four out buildings, which included their home and Hubbell's studio, in what has been called the Cedar Fire. Both have been rebuilt, and they have expanded the compound ever since.

References

External links 
 
 Official website, Ilan-Lael Foundation
 James Hubbell official website
 Askart.com pages on James T. Hubbell

1931 births
Living people
Artists from San Diego
People from Julian, California
Artists from New York (state)
20th-century American architects
21st-century American architects